Kathrin Born-Boyde (born 4 December 1970 in Naumburg, Bezirk Halle) is a retired female race walker from Germany. She competed in three consecutive Summer Olympics for her native country: 1992, 1996 and 2000.

Achievements

References

1970 births
Living people
People from Naumburg (Saale)
German female racewalkers
Athletes (track and field) at the 1992 Summer Olympics
Athletes (track and field) at the 1996 Summer Olympics
Athletes (track and field) at the 2000 Summer Olympics
Olympic athletes of Germany
Sportspeople from Saxony-Anhalt